The Chocolate of the Gang is a 1918 American short comedy film directed by King Vidor.

Cast
 Ruth Hampton as The Heiress	
 Thomas Bellamy as Black Boy
 Ernest Butterworth Jr. as White Boy
 Judge Willis Brown as himself / Commentator

Reception
Like many American films of the time, The Chocolate of the Gang was subject to cuts by city and state film censorship boards. For example, the Chicago Board of Censors required a cut, in Reel 1, of a front view of the nude Black Boy and, in Reel 2, three views of Black Boy through the periscope with pigeons in crate.

See also
List of American films of 1918

References

External links

1918 films
1918 short films
1918 comedy films
Films directed by King Vidor
Silent American comedy films
American black-and-white films
American silent short films
American comedy short films
1910s American films